Pseudoeriphus is a genus of beetles in the family Cerambycidae, containing the following species:

 Pseudoeriphus collaris (Erichson in Schomburg, 1848)
 Pseudoeriphus robustus Tavakilian & Dalens, 2008
 Pseudoeriphus sanguinicollis Zajciw, 1961

References

Trachyderini
Cerambycidae genera